Yuyuan Garden is a station on Line 10 and Line 14 of the Shanghai Metro. It is located near the Yu Garden in Huangpu District, Shanghai. The station entered operation on 10 April 2010.

This station became an interchange station between Line 10 and Line 14 on 30 December 2021.

Station Layout

Around the station
 Fuyou Road Mosque
 Yu Garden

Railway stations in Shanghai
Shanghai Metro stations in Huangpu District
Railway stations in China opened in 2010
Line 10, Shanghai Metro
Line 14, Shanghai Metro